Bernhard Linde (pseudonym Pärt Pärn; 4 April 1886 Järvakandi Parish – 23 August 1954 Tallinn) was an Estonian literary and theatre personnel, critic and essayist.

In 1927 he graduated from Tartu University in Slavic philology. He was related to Young Estonia movement. 1912-1915 he was the chief of Young Estonia's publishing house. 1919-1924 he was the executive director of the publishing house Varrak. 1940-1941 and 1944-1949 he taught at Tallinn University of Technology.

Works

 "Heitlikud ilmad" (novel, 1913)
 "Omad ja võõrad" (collection of essays, 1927)
 "Kenad naised" (collection of novels, 1928)
 "Loova Kesk-Euroopa poole" (collection of essays, 1930)

References

1886 births
1954 deaths
Estonian male short story writers
Estonian literary critics
Estonian translators
Academic staff of the Tallinn University of Technology
People from Rapla Parish
Burials at Metsakalmistu